Karl-Theodor, Duke in Bavaria (9 August 1839 – 30 November 1909), was a member of the House of Wittelsbach and a professional oculist. He was the favorite brother of the Empress Elisabeth of Austria, and father of Queen Elisabeth of the Belgians.

Life

Karl-Theodor was born at Possenhofen Castle, the third son of Duke Maximilian in Bavaria and of his wife, Princess Ludovika of Bavaria.

At the age of fourteen Karl-Theodor joined the Bavarian Army.  In 1866 he fought in the Austro-Prussian War. When he left active duty, he became a student at the Ludwig Maximilian University of Munich, where he studied philosophy, law, economics, and medicine. Among his teachers were the chemist Justus von Liebig, the pathologist Ludwig von Buhl, and the physicist Philipp von Jolly.

In 1870 Karl-Theodor's studies were interrupted by the Franco-Prussian War in which he served as a proprietary colonel of the 3rd Bavarian Light Horse.  After the war he returned to his studies.  In 1872 he was named an honorary Doctor of Medicine by the Ludwig Maximilian University; the following year he completed the requirements for the degree. Then he studied ophthalmology under Professor Deutschland and continued his education under Professor Arlt in Vienna and Professor Horner in Zürich.

In 1877 Karl-Theodor began practicing medicine in Mentone on the Côte d'Azur, often assisted by his wife Maria Josepha. In 1880 he opened an eye-clinic in his castle at Tegernsee. In 1895 he founded the Augenklinik Herzog Carl Theodor in Munich; the clinic in the Nymphenburger Strasse remains one of the most respected eye clinics in Bavaria to the present day. Between 1895 and 1909 Carl Theodor personally carried out more than 5,000 cataract operations as well as treating countless other eye disorders.

Marriages and family

On 11 February 1865, at Dresden, Karl-Theodor married his first cousin Princess Sophie of Saxony (1845–1867), daughter of King John of Saxony and his maternal aunt Princess Amalie Auguste of Bavaria. They had one child:
 Duchess Amalie in Bavaria (24 December 1865 – 26 May 1912) she married Wilhelm, Duke of Urach, on 4 July 1892, and had issue.

On 29 April 1874, at Kleinheubach, Karl-Theodor married Infanta Maria Josepha of Portugal (1857–1943), daughter of exiled King Miguel I of Portugal and Princess Adelaide of Löwenstein-Wertheim-Rosenberg, and had issue:

 Duchess Sophie Adelheid in Bavaria (22 February 1875 – 4 September 1957), married Hans Viet, Count of Törring-Jettenbach, on 26 July 1898, and had issue. 
 Duchess Elisabeth in Bavaria (25 July 1876 – 23 November 1965), married King Albert I of Belgium on 2 October 1900, and had issue.
 Duchess Marie Gabrielle in Bavaria (1878–1912) she married Rupprecht, Crown Prince of Bavaria, on 10 August 1900, and had issue.
 Duke Ludwig Wilhelm in Bavaria (1884–1968), married Princess Eleonore Anna Lucie of Sayn-Wittgenstein-Berleburg on 19 March 1917.
 Duke Franz Joseph in Bavaria (1888–1912)

Prince Karl Theodor died from kidney trouble at Bayreuth on 30 November 1909.

Honours
Karl-Theodor received a number of honours:

He was honorary doctor of the University of Louvain, honorary colonel of the 5th Regiment of Prussian Dragoons, and an honorary member of the Academy of Medical Sciences in Brussels.

Karl-Theodor died at Kreuth in 1909.  He is buried in the family crypt in Schloss Tegernsee.

Ancestry

Bibliography
 Sexau, Richard. Fürst und Arzt, Dr. med. Herzog Carl Theodor in Bayern: Shicksal zwischen Wittelsbach und Habsburg. Graz: Verlag Styria, 1963.
 Trevor-Roper, Patrick Dacre. "The Royal Oculist". British Journal of Ophthalmology 43 (1959): 1–2.

References

External links

 Website of the Herzog Carl Theodor Eye Clinic

1839 births
1909 deaths
People from Starnberg (district)
People from the Kingdom of Bavaria
German ophthalmologists
House of Wittelsbach
Military personnel of Bavaria
People of the Austro-Prussian War
Dukes in Bavaria
Knights of the Golden Fleece of Austria
Grand Crosses of the Order of Saint-Charles